Harpochloa is a genus of African plants in the grass family, common name caterpillar grass.

Species
 Harpochloa falx (L.f.) Kuntze - Eastern Cape, KwaZulu-Natal, Lesotho, Gauteng, Eswatini, Free State, Mpumalanga
 Harpochloa pseudoharpechloa (Chiov.) Clayton - Zaïre, Zambia, Angola

formerly included
 see Microchloa 
 Harpochloa altera - Microchloa altera

References

Chloridoideae
Poaceae genera
Flora of Africa